Everyone Afraid to Be Forgotten (stylised in all caps) is the third studio album by Swedish singer Jonna Lee. It is her first album under the moniker ionnalee. The album was released on 16 February 2018 via Lee's own record label To whom it may concern. and distributed by Kobalt. It was preceded by seven singles that were released throughout 2017 and early 2018: "Samaritan", "Not Human", "Simmer Down", "Gone", "Dunes of Sand", "Joy" and "Work".

Similarly to Lee's collaborative project iamamiwhoami, the album was released with an accompanying film produced by Lee and John Strandh. In visual alliance with Comme des Garçons, Lee is seen wearing the fashion label's designs on the artwork for the album's singles and throughout the album's accompanying film. This is part of an ongoing collaboration with Comme des Garçons. Lee has previously worn their designs during Concert in Blue and while touring with the duo Röyksopp.

Background
On 3 March 2017, iamamiwhoami uploaded a new video to YouTube titled "introducing; ionnalee". The video featured clips from the then forthcoming music video for the song "Samaritan". It was released in full on 10 March 2017 for digital download and streaming and its music video was made available on YouTube. To date the music video has gained over 330,000 views.

A second single, "Not Human", was released on 2 June 2017. The song was co-written by Lee and American electronic musician Com Truise.

A third single, "Simmer Down", was released on 6 October 2017. It was co-written by Lee and her longtime collaborator Claes Björklund. This was the first song in the history of iamamiwhoami and at this point, ionnalee, not to be accompanied by a music video.

The album's fourth single, "Gone", was released on 23 November 2017, along with a music video. With the release of "Gone", Lee also announced the then forthcoming album Everyone Afraid to Be Forgotten and it was made available for pre-order ahead of its 16 February 2018 release.

With the announcement of Everyone Afraid to Be Forgotten, the album was described as being "a reflection of an anxious age where everyone keeps raising their voice louder, where a song isn't enough, where individuality is sold and promoted as products on social media, making statements to be immortalised and it's [Lee's] own fear not being visible in the shadows".

A trailer for the album's accompanying film was released on 11 January 2018, and a fifth single "Dunes of Sand" was released on 19 January 2018 featuring vocals from Jamie Irrepressible. This was the second song not to be accompanied by a music video. However, a live performance filmed at Lee's childhood church in Fivelstad, Sweden, was uploaded to YouTube with Claes Björklund accompanying her on the church's organ. Lee revealed in a post on Instagram that only her father, sister and the church's janitor were in attendance.

On 2 February 2018, two weeks before the album was released, "Joy" was released as the sixth single along with its music video. It was followed by the seventh and final single, "Work", on 9 February 2018 and marked the third single not to receive a music video.

In a message published on Facebook on 16 February 2018, Lee revealed she had been working on the album for two and a half years, but the creative process had been 10 years in the making. The song "Work" was first intended for iamamiwhoami's album Kin (2012), but only received a finalised chorus for Everyone Afraid to Be Forgotten. The song "Here Is a Warning" was written for an unreleased solo project Mouth of the River. The verses of "Simmer Down" were conceived before iamamiwhoami and its chorus was written for Everyone Afraid to Be Forgotten. The songs "Gone" and "Like Hell" are full versions of two early clips released by iamamiwhoami in 2010 when their cryptic videos went viral online. "Like Hell" was also performed a capella during iamamiwhoami's online concert in December 2010.

Lyrics to the songs "Samaritan" and "Fold" were included in a cryptic interview published by Bullet Media in 2011.

Film
Much like iamamiwhoami's releases, Everyone Afraid to Be Forgotten has an accompanying film. The film premiered on ionnalee.com on 16 February 2018 and could be watched for free via YouTube. It was produced by Lee and John Strandh.

The film follows Lee, as the film's protagonist, through various chapters as she escapes captivity and finds herself isolated from the outside world by those who helped her. Lee is told about an "unending party" and, after some time, finds herself drawn to leave the care of those helping her in order to discover the party for herself. She is rejected by the guests at the party and finds solace in others who are from the "outside" like she is. Together, they fight against those who rejected them and attend the party. Lee is later captured and held captive within the same room where the film opened.

Tour background and crowdfunding
On 2 February 2018, Lee announced that a live show would take place on 9 May 2018 at Heaven, London. Later the same day, Lee announced plans for a world tour and asked her followers to help make it a reality. She launched a Kickstarter to raise funds to produce the world tour. The Kickstarter's goal of 375,000 SEK was achieved within five days. Lee posted a message on Instagram to thank her followers for their support.

On 4 March 2018, it was announced that the Kickstater's first stretch goal was reached securing one more location for the tour and Barcelona was revealed as the additional location. A second stretch goal, enabling merchandise to be sold on the tour, was reached on 6 March 2018. A third stretch goal, enabling a live version of "Dunes of Sand" to be released was reached on 14 March 2018. This was followed by a fourth stretch goal enabling a second additional date in Rio de Janeiro to be added to the tour.

The Kickstarter closed at midnight on 16 March 2018 having raised a total of 750,187 kr.

Tour dates

Critical reception

Everyone Afraid to Be Forgotten received mixed to positive reviews from music critics. Ben Hogwood of musicOMH wrote, "There is no doubt that Everyone Afraid To Be Forgotten is a hugely ambitious piece of work, and it throws a lot of effort into the creative process while making use of the considerable guile Lee has with her best electronic work. At times it could do with more of this, for its biggest tracks are overblown, and it does threaten to overstay its welcome at an hour and five minutes." Nadia Younes of The Skinny described the album as "confusing, inconsistent and overly complicated" Rose Kerr of Spectrum Culture declared that on the album, "synth and dance-pop prevail, with an intriguing battle on display between her avant-garde tendencies and more accessible pop" and added that the artist has "chosen not to change her synth-pop style and dramatic aesthetics."

Track listing
All tracks written and produced by Jonna Lee, except where noted.

Notes
 All track titles are stylised in all caps.

Personnel
Credits adapted from the liner notes of Everyone Afraid to Be Forgotten.

Music
 ionnalee – vocals, instruments, production
 Claes Björklund – instruments, mixing ; production 
 TR/ST – vocals, production 
 Sören von Malmborg – mastering

Visual
 ionnalee – film direction, film editing
 John Strandh – film direction, grading
 Chimney Sweden – visual effects

Artwork
 ionnalee – art direction, sculpture
 John Strandh – art direction, photography
 Jacob Hulmston – graphic design

Release history

Accolades
Awards

Year End Lists

References

2010s musical films
2018 albums
Jonna Lee (singer) albums